Chamaedoreeae is a palm tribe in the subfamily Arecoideae. It has five genera.

Genera
Hyophorbe – Mascarenes
Wendlandiella – Peruvian Amazon
Synechanthus – Central America, Colombia, Ecuador
Chamaedorea – Central America, NW South America
Gaussia – Mexico, Belize, Cuba

See also
 List of Arecaceae genera

References

 
Monocot tribes
Taxa named by Carl Georg Oscar Drude